Rebuilding Alliance (RA) is a non-profit organization based in Redwood City, California,  founded by electrical engineer Donna Baranski-Walker in 2003, that rebuilds homes and communities in regions of war and occupation. It developed from the Global Campaign to rebuild Palestinian Homes Organization, which had been dissolved a year earlier.

Baransky-Walker who also holds an M.S. in Agricultural Engineering from the University of Hawai'i, worked as an inventions licensing associate at M.I.T., Stanford and SRI International. Her activist work has been recognized by Solidarity, who presented her with a Medal of Gratitude, and two certificates of Special Congressional Recognition. In 2003 she was awarded the Lewis Mumford Award for Development by the Architects, Designers, and Planners for Social Responsibility.

RA advocates for government policies towards these regions based on human rights and international law. Through a mutual commitment to justice, RA has created alliances among supporters, partners, and those who suffer injustice and violence, yet resist through rebuilding. RA projects are symbols of hope that help rebuild shattered communities and offer people around the world immediate ways to make peace, starting with the tangible support of a family's right to a home.

In the Palestinian territories, the group has had two foci of activity: Area C, 60% of the West Bank where 150,000 Palestinians live, and where, the organization states, Israel does not permit Palestinians to build on their own land, by refusing building licenses. Secondly  they support the Rachel Corrie Rebuilding Campaign in Gaza, where over 30,000 Palestinians in Gaza made homeless after 2000, Rebuilding Alliance partnered with the Gaza Community Mental Health Programme to rebuild homes, schools, and communities. The starting point was the rebuilding of the Nasrallah family home that was the site of Rachel Corrie's death, and which was demolished later. The house was rebuilt in 2007.

The NGO played a role in lobbying the US Senate to intervene and stop the demolition of the Jordan Valley  Palestinian village of Aqabah, where it had built a three-storey kindergarten.

References

American Jews
International nongovernmental organizations
Israeli–Palestinian conflict
Non-governmental organizations involved in the Israeli–Palestinian peace process
Non-profit organizations based in California
2003 establishments in California
Organizations established in 2003